Mathmakers was a Canadian educational children's television series produced from 1978 to 1980 by the province of Ontario's public television network, TVOntario. The series starred Derek McGrath and Lyn Harvey.

Producer/Director Clive Vanderburgh, Production Assistant Jane Downey and Brian Elston, Editor.

The premise is set in a television studio where the production crew produces an educational series illustrating various concepts of grade school mathematics.

External links
A fan site dedicated to classic TVO children's shows of the 1970s

1970s Canadian children's television series
Canadian children's education television series
TVO original programming
Television shows filmed in Toronto
Mathematics education television series